HD 104304 (24 G. Virginis) is a binary star system in the zodiac constellation Virgo. It has a combined apparent visual magnitude of 5.54, making it visible to the unaided eye under suitable viewing conditions. The system is located at a distance of 41 light-years from the Sun based on parallax measurements. The primary component has a stellar classification of G8 IV, which means that this is a subgiant star that has left the main sequence and has begun to evolve into a giant star. The secondary is a faint red dwarf star with a class of M4V.

In 2007, a candidate planet was announced orbiting the primary. This was updated in 2010 when two independent papers announced the discovery of a common proper motion companion red dwarf. The most likely orbit has a period of 48.5 years and an eccentricity of 0.29. Further measurement will be needed to determine whether the star has a planetary companion, but further companions with masses above  and separated by at least 3.9 au can be ruled out.

References

G-type subgiants
HR, 4587
M-type main-sequence stars
Binary stars

Virgo (constellation)
Durchmusterung objects
0454
Virginis, 24
104304
058576
4587